Wang Ming-wan (born November 22, 1961), also known as O Meien, is a professional Go player.

Biography 
Wang was born in Taipei, Taiwan. He is known for his quick fuseki and fighting ability. He became a pro in 1977, two years after moving to Japan. He advanced to 9 dan in 1992.

Titles and runners-up

External links
GoBase Profile
Nihon Ki-in Profile (Japanese)

1961 births
Living people
Taiwanese Go players
Japanese people of Taiwanese descent
Sportspeople from Tainan
Go players at the 2010 Asian Games
Asian Games competitors for Japan